Statistics of Nemzeti Bajnokság I in the 1931–32 season.

Overview
It was contested by 12 teams, and Ferencvárosi TC won the championship.

League standings

This is the only time that team won the all matches in one of European leagues.

Results

References
Hungary - List of final tables (RSSSF)

Nemzeti Bajnokság I seasons
Hun
1